Westbourne Park may refer to:

 Westbourne Park, London, former name of Westbourne
 Westbourne Park tube station, London Underground station
 Westbourne Park, South Australia